The Dunărița is a right tributary of the river Târnava in Romania. It flows into the Târnava near Cistei.

References

Rivers of Romania
Rivers of Alba County